Streptomyces tanashiensis is a bacterium species from the genus of Streptomyces which has been isolated from soil in Japan. Streptomyces tanashiensis produces luteomycin, mithramycin, phosphoramidon and kalafungin.

Further reading

See also 
 List of Streptomyces species

References

External links
Type strain of Streptomyces tanashiensis at BacDive -  the Bacterial Diversity Metadatabase	

tanashiensis
Bacteria described in 1952